Muhammad Jamil Al-Mayahi (Arabic محمد جميل المياحي) also known as Muhammad Jamil Oudeh Al-Gharibawi, was born in Iraq in Wasit Governorate in Al-Hayy district in 1983. He is one of the leaders of the National Wisdom Movement in Wasit Governorate in Iraq. He was elected as the governor of Wasit governorate by the Wasit provincial council in its session held on Tuesday (11/13-2018) to succeed the resigned Mahmoud Abd Al-Reda Talal, who won as a deputy in the parliament in its current session.

References

1983 births
Iraqi people
Iraqi nationalists
Iraqi politicians
Living people